The Glasgow and South Western Railway (GSWR) 105 class is a class of four 0-4-2 steam locomotives designed in 1856.

Development 
Four examples of this class were designed by Patrick Stirling for the GSWR and were built at R & W Hawthorn (Works Nos. 950-3) between January and May 1856. They were numbered 105–108. The members of the class were fitted with domed boilers and safety valves over the firebox.

Seven further examples were built in 1857 with a longer  +  wheelbase as the 9 class.

Withdrawal 
The 105 class were withdrawn by James Stirling between 1884 and 1887.

References 

105
0-4-2 locomotives
Standard gauge steam locomotives of Great Britain
Railway locomotives introduced in 1856